Matthew Adam Metcalf (born 28 July 1969) is an English retired professional football forward who played in the Football League for Brentford.

Career 
Metcalf scored over 100 goals in non-league football for local Norfolk clubs Wymondham Town, Diss Town and Wroxham before joining Southern League South Division club Braintree Town. There he was spotted by Bobby Tambling and recommended to David Webb, manager of newly relegated Second Division club Brentford, early in the 1993–94 season. Metcalf signed a two-year contract with the Bees for a £10,000 fee in September 1993, but made just 9 appearances before his contract was terminated at the end of the season. He scored 13 goals in 22 reserve appearances for Brentford.

Career statistics

References

1969 births
Footballers from Norwich
English footballers
English Football League players
Association football forwards
Brentford F.C. players
Braintree Town F.C. players
Diss Town F.C. players
Wroxham F.C. players
Living people
Southern Football League players
Wymondham Town F.C. players